The Clover Pass School is a historic school building in Ketchikan Gateway Borough, Alaska. The small one-room wood-frame structure was built in 1947, and was used as a one-room school until 1961. It thereafter was used as a local community center and is now owned by Historic Ketchikan (although the land on which it sits is owned by the federal government and administered by the United States Bureau of Land Management).

The building was listed on the National Register of Historic Places in 2005.

See also
National Register of Historic Places listings in Ketchikan Gateway Borough, Alaska

References

External links
 Clover Pass School from Historic Ketchikan

1947 establishments in Alaska
1961 disestablishments in Alaska
Defunct schools in Alaska
Buildings and structures on the National Register of Historic Places in Ketchikan Gateway Borough, Alaska
School buildings on the National Register of Historic Places in Alaska
One-room schoolhouses in Alaska
Schools in Ketchikan Gateway Borough, Alaska